Vasile Dîba (born 24 July 1954) is a retired Romanian sprint canoeist. Competing in three Summer Olympics in 1976–1984, he won four medals with one gold (1976: K-1 500 m), one silver (1980: K-4 1000 m), and two bronzes (1976: K-1 1000 m, 1980: K-1 500 m). Dîba also won seven medals at the ICF Canoe Sprint World Championships with five golds (K-1 500 m: 1974, 1977, 1978; K-1 1000 m: 1977, K-1 4×500 m: 1974) and two silvers (K-1 500 m and K-1 4×500 m: both 1975).

References

External links

1954 births
Canoeists at the 1976 Summer Olympics
Canoeists at the 1980 Summer Olympics
Canoeists at the 1984 Summer Olympics
Living people
Olympic gold medalists for Romania
Olympic silver medalists for Romania
Olympic bronze medalists for Romania
Romanian male canoeists
Olympic medalists in canoeing
ICF Canoe Sprint World Championships medalists in kayak

Medalists at the 1980 Summer Olympics
Medalists at the 1976 Summer Olympics